Irakere & Trabuco - En Vivo, Poliedro de Caracas, Mayo 15 '81 is a Vinyl-LP live album released in 1982.

The Cuban band Irakere of Chucho Valdés and  El Trabuco Venezolano led by Alberto Naranjo shared a stage three times – twice in Venezuela at the Poliedro de Caracas, in 1979 and 1981 (two concerts each year), and once at the Teatro Carlos Marx in Havana, Cuba in 1981. This recording shows the second of the two face-to-face historic encounters between Irakere and Trabuco that were held in Caracas on May 14 and 15 of 1981. This time, the blend of Afro-Cuban and Western elements in the music of Irakere is smoother, more organic, with the jazz influence diminished in favor of contagious dance rhythms. In the opener, Irakere pays tribute to the legendary tresista Arsenio Rodríguez with his popular-song composition El guayo de Catalina, which features a vocal performance by Oscar Valdés and a robust electric guitar solo from Carlos Emilio Morales. It is particularly interesting to hear Tres días, composed by Chucho Valdés, at the time a huge success in Colombia, Puerto Rico and Venezuela through Trabuco Venezolano's version sung by Carlos Daniel Palacios. In addition, Oscar Valdés is now joined by Palacios to share the vocal duties and Naranjo also collaborates on timbales. To close the set, Irakere looks backward with an invigorating rendition of Los caramelos, created by Gregorio Battle and sung by Valdés, with solos by Jorge Varona on trumpet and Morales on guitar. The other side opens with Formas libres, an instrumental theme created  by Naranjo, where his Trabuco adopt a more radical view of music when dealing with complexity of expression, loosely based on free jazz experimentation and uncompromising ideas. The theme is composed of solos by Samuel del Real (piano), Gustavo Aranguren (trumpet) and Rafael Silva (trombone). But the band is at its most interesting when it stretches out, then comes Imágenes latinas, a warm homage to Conjunto Libre and trombonist Barry Rogers. This song provides an emotional vocal showcase for Palacios, and is interspersed with long solos by Lorenzo Barriendos (bass), William Mora (bongos), José Navarro (timbales) and Felipe Rengifo (congas), with impeccable support from the brass section. The closing track on the album, Tema, is a miniature instrumental that slows things down yet continues to maintain repeated listenings.

Track listing

 Erroneously labeled as El Caramelo, by Jesús Valdés

Credits

Irakere
 Chucho Valdés - keyboards, arranger, director
 Carlos Emilio Morales - electric guitar, percussion
 Carlos del Puerto - bass guitar, chorus
 Enrique Plá - drums, percussion
 Jorge Alfonzo - congas, percussion
 Juan Munguía - trumpet, flugel horn, valve trombone
 Jorge Varona - trumpet, flugel horn, percussion
 Germán Velasco - soprano and alto saxophones, flute, chorus
 Carlos Averhoff - soprano and tenor saxophones, flute, chorus
 José Luis Cortés - baritone saxophone, flute, chorus
 Oscar Valdés - lead vocalist, percussion

El Trabuco Venezolano
 Alberto Naranjo - drums, arranger, director
 Samuel del Real - acoustic piano
 Lorenzo Barriendos - bass guitar
 José Navarro - timbales 
 Felipe Rengifo - congas
 William Mora - bongos
 Luis Arias - lead trumpet
 Gustavo Aranguren - trumpet
 José Díaz F. - trumpet and flugel horn
 Manolo Pérez - trumpet and flugel horn
 Rafael Silva - lead trombone
 Alejandro Pérez Palma - trombone
 Leopoldo Escalante - trombone
 Carlos Daniel Palacios - lead singer and chorus
 Joe Ruiz - lead singer and chorus
 Carlos Espósito - lead singer and chorus

Other credits
 Hosts: Phidias Danilo Escalona (Irakere) and Rafael Rivas (Trabuco)
 Artistic producers: Orlando Montiel and Alberto Naranjo
 Production manager: Prudencio Sánchez
 Staff coordinator: Freddy Sanz
 Graphic design: Miguel Angel Briceño and Orlando Montiel
 Label: Integra C. A. IG-10.041, 1982
 Place of recording: Poliedro de Caracas
 Recording engineer: Gustavo Quintero
 Mixing: Gustavo Quintero, Orlando Montiel and Alberto Naranjo, at Estudios del Este
 Produced in Caracas, Venezuela, 1982

External links
Salsa2u.com
Sincopa.com
Venciclopedia.com - Irakere & Trabuco, En Vivo Poliedro de Caracas Mayo 15 '81

1982 albums
Alberto Naranjo albums